Melpomene elegans is a species of spider in the family Agelenidae. It is found in Mexico.

References 

 Melpomene elegans at the World Spider Catalog

Agelenidae
Spiders of Mexico
Spiders described in 1898